Nonie Ray (born 3 October 1958) is a British rower. She competed in the women's double sculls event at the 1984 Summer Olympics.

References

External links
 

1958 births
Living people
British female rowers
Olympic rowers of Great Britain
Rowers at the 1984 Summer Olympics
People from Petersfield